The Cathedral of the Angels, commonly referred to as Xichang Catholic Church, also known as Yong'angong Church during the Republican Era, is the Roman Catholic cathedral of the Diocese of Ningyuan, situated on Sanya Street, Xichang (formerly known as Ningyuan), in Sichuan's Liangshan Yi Autonomous Prefecture.

Description 
Roman Catholicism was introduced into Ningyuan in the 18th century. The French missionary  was put in charge of the evangelistic work in this region by Paris Foreign Missions Society since 1903. Under Guébriant's supervision, construction of the Cathedral of the Angels started in 1908. The structure consisted of the cathedral, a bell tower, a courtyard and episcopal residence. It was not completed until 1912. The architectural form was inspired by ancient Roman architecture, blended with conspicuous traditional style developed in Sichuan, as visible on the "flying cornices" on the top of the cathedral's façade, which are distinct from those found in other provinces of China.

The bell tower was built on the east side of the cathedral with a cross on the top, which originally housed a bell cast in France. It was destroyed in 1968 during the sociopolitical purge movement of Cultural Revolution.

Gallery

See also 
 Catholic Church in Sichuan
 Cathedral of St Joseph, Chongqing
 Cathedral of the Immaculate Conception, Chengdu

References 

Xichang
Roman Catholic cathedrals in China
Roman Catholic churches completed in 1912
20th-century Roman Catholic church buildings in China
Xichang